Sebastián Silva may refer to:

Sebastián Silva (basketball) (born 1996), Chilean basketball player 
Sebastián Silva (director) (born 1979), Chilean film director
Sebastián Silva (footballer) (born 1991), Chilean footballer 
Sebastián Silva (entertainer), Colombian internet personality